The 1973 Birmingham International was a men's tennis tournament played on indoor carpet courts at the Birmingham Municipal Auditorium in Birmingham, Alabama, in the United States that was part of the 1973 USLTA Indoor Circuit. It was the inaugural edition of the event and was held from January 17 through January 20, 1973. Unseeded Sandy Mayer won the singles title but due to his amateur status he was not entitled to receive the $3,000 first-prize money.

Finals

Singles
 Sandy Mayer defeated  Charlie Owens 6–4, 7–6
 It was Mayer's first singles title of his career.

Doubles
 Jürgen Fassbender /  Pat Cramer defeated  Ion Țiriac /  Clark Graebner 6–4, 7–5

References

Birmingham International
Birmingham International
Birmingham International